Grupo CIE (Corporacion Interamericana de Entretenimiento. Spanish for: Interamerican Entertainment Corporation) is a Mexican entertainment and media company. It is leader of Latin American entertainment sector, focusing especially on the markets of Hispanic and Portuguese language, including the Latin market of the United States. Grupo CIE is a Latin American amalgam of Live Nation. The company operates various main venues, auditoriums and theme parks in all Latin countries; also it is in charge of promote a great variety of live events, commercial fairs and exhibitions, access the advertising ticket commercialization (including Ticketmaster Mexico and Ticketmaster Brazil), sponsorships, foods, promotional drinks and articles for events and entertainment. Also, the Group participates in the film industry, through the production and distribution of films.

Divisions

Grupo CIE is divided into five divisions which controls different sectors of the market:
CIE Entretenimiento: Which includes OCESA, the main concert and spectacle producer in Latin America, OCESA Colombia, OCESA Seitrack, OCESA Teatro and Ticketmaster Mexico.
CIE Las Americas: Which includes the operation of Hipodromo de Las Americas horse race track, [Centro Banamex] (Mexico City's main convention center), and the Sports Yak and Yaks Entertainment Centers (which includes bingo and electronic sports bets, as gambling is forbidden in Mexico).
CIE Comercial: Which includes commercial and media producers like Media Innovations.
CIE Parques de Diversiones: Managing eight different theme parks in Mexico and Wannado City in Sunrise, USA.
CIE Internacional: Controls all the foreign branches of Grupo CIE, including CIE Argentina and CIE Brazil.

Venues
Grupo CIE operates some of the main venues in Mexico like:

Palacio de los Deportes
Foro Sol
Auditorio Banamex
Arena VFG
Teatro Telcel
Teatro de los Insurgentes

References

Companies based in Mexico City
Entertainment companies established in 1990
Entertainment companies of Mexico
Mass media companies of Mexico
Privately held companies of Mexico